Jhalari झलारी is a Village Development Committee in Kanchanpur District in  Sudurpashchim Province of South-Far-Western Nepal. At the time of the 1991 Nepal census it had a population of 10,590 people living in 1702 individual households.

Wards
Jhalari is a VDC (Village Development Committee) located 20.5 km from the Mahendra Nagar. Jhalari is being developed as the main market of Kanchanpur District. Jhalari VDC is divided into 9 Wards as per rule. But the two wards of Jhalari Ward no.1--Hirapur and ward no.8--Arjuni are displaced during the expansion of Shuklaphanta Wildlife Reserve. So there are only 7 wards remaining now.

Ward No.1: Hirapur, Displaced while expanding the Shuklphanta Wildlife reserve.

Ward No. 2: Juda, Kalapani, Stationpur, Jhandabhoj, Jabda, Simalphata Located in the North of Jhalari VDC attached with Chure Parbat in the North, Syali River in the West, Kashroul in the South and Phuleli and Sisaiya in the East.

Ward No. 3: Banjariya, Toti (Tripureswor), Located in the middle of Jhalari VDC surrounded by villages from all sides. Jhalari Bazaar is located in the South, Amarpur in the East, Sisaiya and in the North, and Toti in the West.

Ward No. 4:Pariphata, Phuleli Located in the northern region of Jhalari.

Ward No. 5: Sisaiya

Ward No. 6: Kashroul, Located in the Western part of Jhalari. North: Juda South: Bansamiti East: Lalpaniya West: Syali River. One of the main habitats of Tharus.

Ward No. 7: Jhalari Bazaar, the central market of Jhalari VDC with several trade centers.

Ward No. 8: Arjuni, Displaced while expanding the Shuklaphanta Wildlife reserve.

Ward No. 9: Amarpur, Kaluwapur, Dulaina(Deepnagar), placed 1 km from Jhalari Bazaar in the East side.

Administration 
The administrative office of Jhalari VDC is located in the north of Jhalari Bazzar. Main market of Jhalari Bazaar is divided into two sides by Mahendra Rajmarga.  The office of Village Development Committee is approximately 900 m to the north of Mahendra Highway.

Education
This VDC has done too many developments in the field of education. The general statistics of the schools can be divided as follows.

1) Child Cares: More than 20

2) Primary Schools: More than 15

3) Lower Secondary Schools: More than 5

4) Secondary Schools: 7+ Private Schools

5) Higher Secondary School: 6

6) College: 1 (Shree Krishn Baijanath Multiple College)

Medicine and amenities
This VDC has got one Health Post and One Sub-Health Post.

The Sundevi Temple, Mudka Baba, and many temples of Baba Baijanath are the religious places of Jhalari VDC.  As like Shuklaphanta Wildlife Reserve is second main place to visit in Jhalari VDC. The reserve is home to animals like elephant, tigers, rhinos, 12 horned deer and other animals.

References

 P.Yar.B
 GPO Nepal

Populated places in Kanchanpur District